Lost Time is the third studio album by Seattle-based pop punk band Tacocat, released on April 1, 2016 on Hardly Art. It was produced by Erik Blood.

Critical reception

According to review aggregator Metacritic, based on 13 critic reviews, Lost Time has a score of 76 out of 100, indicating "generally favorable reviews".

Accolades

Track listing
"Dana Katherine Scully" – 3:12
"FDP" – 1:29
"I Love Seattle" – 2:36
"I Hate the Weekend" – 2:05
"You Can't Fire Me, I Quit" – 2:13
"The Internet" – 2:48
"Plan A, Plan B" – 1:54
"Talk" – 2:54
"Men Explain Things to Me" – 1:56
"Horse Grrls" – 2:19
"Night Swimming" – 2:26
"Leisure Bees" – 6:59

Personnel
Eric Blood – engineer, producer
Lelah Maupin – artwork, group member
Bree McKenna – group member
Emily Nokes – artwork, group member
Kelly O – photography
Eric Randall – group member
Adam Straney – mastering
Tacocat – drawing, primary artist

References

Hardly Art albums
2016 albums
Tacocat albums